Acisanthera is a genus of flowering plants in the family Melastomataceae. It contains 11 species and is found in South America, Central America, and the Caribbean. It was described by Patrick Browne in 1756.

Distribution
Many species in this genus are found in waterlogged savannas of the tropical regions of Central and South America.

Species
, Kew's Plants of the World Online accepts the following species:
Acisanthera alata Cogn.
Acisanthera alsinefolia (DC.) Triana
Acisanthera ayangannae (Wurdack) M.J.Rocha & P.J.F.Guim.
Acisanthera boliviensis Cogn. ex Kuntze
Acisanthera glazioviana Cogn.
Acisanthera hedyotoidea Triana
Acisanthera paraguayensis Cogn.
Acisanthera pulchella Cogn.
Acisanthera quadrata Juss. ex Poir.
Acisanthera uniflora (Vahl) Gleason
Acisanthera variabilis Triana

References

Melastomataceae
Melastomataceae genera